Hofstra is a Dutch surname. It may refer to:

David Hofstra (born 1953), American jazz musician
Henk Hofstra (1904–1999), Dutch politician
Rick Hofstra (born 1977), Dutch darts player
William S. Hofstra (1861–1932), American lumber entrepreneur and philanthropist; namesake of Hofstra University in New York

See also
Hofstra University

Dutch-language surnames